The Tandag National Science High School (Mataas na Paaralang Nasyonal na Pang-Agham ng Tandag) (TNSHS) is a secondary public science high school system located in Tandag City, Surigao del Sur, Philippines. It is a DepEd-legislated science high school.

TNSHS is situated at Tabon-Tabon, Quezon, Tandag City, Surigao del Sur and is accessible through pedicabs, multicabs, private vehicles and motorcycles.

Notable achievements and recognition

Batch 2006:
National Champion for the BSP Oratorical Contest
NAT Top 5
Batch 2011
National Champion for the entertainment night in PSYSC 2010.

Schools in Surigao del Sur
Science high schools in the Philippines